Valentina is a 1950 Argentine comedy film directed by Manuel Romero and starring Olga Zubarry, Juan José Miguez and Elena Lucena. The film's sets were designed by Ricardo J. Conord.

Cast

References

Bibliography 
 Insaurralde, Andrés. Manuel Romero. Centro Editor de América Latina, 1994.

External links 

1950 films
Argentine comedy films
1950 comedy films
1950s Spanish-language films
Films directed by Manuel Romero
Argentine black-and-white films
1950s Argentine films